Chinoz is a district of Tashkent Region in Uzbekistan. The capital lies at the city Chinoz. The district consists of one city (Chinoz), 9 urban-type settlements (Olmazor, Yangi Chinoz, Gulzorobod, Doʻstlik, Paxta, A.Temur, Birlik, Chorvador, Kir) and 8 rural communities (Isloxat, Eshonobod, Turkiston, Oʻzbekiston, Chinoz, Eski Toshkent, Koʻtarma, Yollama).

References

Districts of Uzbekistan
Tashkent Region